Maria Anna Walburga Ignatia Mozart (30 July 1751 – 29 October 1829), called "Marianne" and nicknamed Nannerl, was a musician, the older sister of Wolfgang Amadeus Mozart (1756–1791) and daughter of Leopold (1719–1787) and Anna Maria Mozart (1720–1778).

Childhood

Maria Anna (Marianne) Mozart was born in Salzburg. When she was seven years old, her father Leopold Mozart started teaching her to play the harpsichord. Leopold took her and Wolfgang on tours of many cities, such as Vienna and Paris, to showcase their talents. In the early days, she sometimes received top billing, and she was noted as an excellent harpsichord player and fortepianist.

However, given the views of her parents, prevalent in her society at the time, it became impossible as she grew older for her to continue her career any further. According to New Grove, "from 1769 onwards she was no longer permitted to show her artistic talent on travels with her brother, as she had reached a marriageable age." Wolfgang went on during the 1770s to many artistic triumphs while traveling in Italy with Leopold, but Marianne stayed at home in Salzburg with her mother. She likewise stayed home with Leopold when Wolfgang visited Paris and other cities (1777–1779) accompanied by his mother. From 1772 on she taught the piano in Salzburg and through her work added greatly to Leopold Mozart's reputation as a teacher.

There is evidence that Marianne wrote musical compositions, as there are letters from Wolfgang praising her work, but the voluminous correspondence of her father never mentions any of her compositions, and none have survived.

Marriage and children
In contrast to her brother, who quarreled with their father and eventually disobeyed his wishes concerning career path and choice of spouse, Marianne remained on good terms with her father. Around the summer of 1783, she seems to have developed a relationship with Franz d'Ippold, who was a captain and private tutor. Why this relationship did not evolve into a marriage is not known. Wolfgang attempted, in vain, to get Marianne to stand up for her own preference.

Eventually, Marianne married a magistrate, Johann Baptist Franz von Berchtold zu Sonnenburg (23 August 1784), and settled with him in St. Gilgen, a village in Austria about 29 km east of the Mozart family home in Salzburg. Berchtold was twice a widower and had five children from his two previous marriages, whom Marianne helped raise. She also bore three children of her own: Leopold Alois Pantaleon (1785–1840), Jeanette (1789–1805) and Marie Babette (1790–1791).

However, she continued to see herself as a pianist, practicing three hours a day and continuing to teach the piano.

Leopold's raising of her son
An unusual episode in Marianne's life occurred when she gave birth (27 July 1785) to her first child, a son who was named Leopold after his grandfather. Marianne had traveled from her home in St. Gilgen to Salzburg for the birth. When she returned to St. Gilgen, she left her infant in the care of her father and his servants. The elder Leopold stated (by a letter that preceded Marianne back to St. Gilgen) that he would prefer to raise the child for the first few months himself. In 1786, he extended the arrangement to an indefinite term. Leopold continued to care for his grandson, taking delight in his progress (toilet training, speech, and so on), and commencing with the very beginnings of musical training. Marianne saw her son on occasional visits, but in general, was not involved in his care. The arrangement continued until the death of her father, on 28 May 1787.

Biographers differ on the reasons for this arrangement. Little Leopold was ill in his infancy, and perhaps needed to be kept in Salzburg for this reason, but this does not explain why he was still kept there after his recovery. Another possibility attributes the arrangement to Marianne's delicate health or her need to take care of her stepchildren. Biographer Maynard Solomon attributes the arrangement to Leopold's wish to revive his skills in training a musical genius, as he had done with Wolfgang. He also suggests that giving up her son was indicative of Marianne's total subordination to her father's wishes.

Relationship with Wolfgang

When Wolfgang was a toddler, Nannerl (four and a half years older) was his idol. According to Maynard Solomon, "at three, Mozart was inspired to study music by observing his father's instruction of Marianne; he wanted to be like her." The two children were very close, and they invented a secret language and an imaginary "Kingdom of Back" of which they were king and queen. Wolfgang's early correspondence with Marianne is affectionate and includes some of the scatological and sexual wordplay in which Wolfgang indulged with intimates. Occasionally Wolfgang wrote entries in Marianne's diary, referring to himself in the third person.

Wolfgang wrote several works for Marianne to perform, including the Prelude and Fugue in C, K. 394 (1782) and the four Preludes K. 395/300g (1777.). Until 1785, he sent her copies of his piano concertos (up to No. 21) in St. Gilgen.

Concerning the relationship between Wolfgang and Marianne in adulthood, authorities differ. According to New Grove, Wolfgang "remained closely attached to her." In contrast, Maynard Solomon contends that in later life Wolfgang and Marianne drifted apart completely. He notes, for instance, that after Wolfgang's visit to Salzburg in 1783 (with his new wife Constanze), Wolfgang and Marianne never visited each other again, that they never saw each other's children, and that their correspondence diminished to a trickle, ceasing entirely in 1788.

Wolfgang died on 5 December 1791. Sometime around 1800, Marianne encountered Franz Xaver Niemetschek's 1798 biography of Wolfgang. Since this biography had been written from the perspective of Vienna and of Constanze, much of its content was new to Marianne. In an 1800 letter, she wrote:

Herr Prof. Niemetschek's biography so completely reanimated my sisterly feelings toward my so ardently beloved brother that I was often dissolved in tears since it is only now that I became acquainted with the sad condition in which my brother found himself.

Later years

Marianne's husband died in 1801. She returned to Salzburg, at first accompanied by her two living children. Financially well provided for she still gave piano lessons and was a highly esteemed piano soloist in the concerts at Prince Ernst von Schwarzenberg's. Her students during this time included Anna Sick, who later became the court pianist at Stuttgart.

In her old age, Marianne had her first encounter in person with Wolfgang's widow Constanze since the visit of 1783. In 1824, Constanze and her second husband Georg Nikolaus von Nissen moved to Salzburg. Although Marianne had not even known that Constanze was still alive, the encounter was apparently "cordial", though not warm. Eventually, Marianne did the Nissens a great favor: to help them write a biography of Wolfgang, Marianne lent the Nissens her collection of family letters, including Wolfgang and Leopold's correspondence up to 1781.

In 1821, Marianne enjoyed a visit from Wolfgang's son, Franz Xaver Mozart, whom she had never met during her brother's lifetime. The son had come from his home in Lemberg to conduct a performance of his father's Requiem in remembrance of the recently deceased Nissen.

In her last years, Marianne's health declined, and she became blind in 1825. Mary Novello, visiting in 1829, recorded her impression that Mrs. Berchtold was "blind, languid, exhausted, feeble and nearly speechless", as well as lonely. She mistakenly took Marianne to be impoverished, though in fact she was frugal and left a large fortune (7,837 florins).

Marianne died on 29 October 1829, at 78 years, and was buried in St Peter's Cemetery, Salzburg.

As a fictional character
Many authors have created fictional characters based on Maria Anna Mozart.
English songwriter Leon Rosselson wrote the song "Whatever Happened to Nannerl?" and recorded it on his album Wo sind die Elefanten? (1991)
 The Secret Wish of Nannerl Mozart (1996) by Barbara Kathleen Nickel is a young adult novel.
 Marianne was the subject of a 2001 "biography in poems", The Other Mozart by Sharon Chmielarz.
 Mozart's Sister, a 2005 novel by Alison Bauld, follows Nannerl Mozart's life through marriage, children, widowhood, and death in conversations with her nephew Franz Xaver, Wolfgang's younger son.
 Nancy Moser wrote Mozart's Sister: A Novel (2006).
 Ann Turnbull's 2007 young adult novel Mary Ann and Miss Mozart refers to Maria Anna Mozart.
 The popular young adult author Carolyn Meyer wrote of Nannerl's life in her 2008 novel In Mozart's Shadow: His Sister's Story.
 Marianne was the subject of Nannerl, la sœur de Mozart (Mozart's Sister), a 2010 French-language film from director René Féret.
In his 2011 novel Mozart's Last Aria, Matt Rees has Nannerl investigating her brother's death.
In 2013, Marianne's life was adapted into a one-person theatre piece called The Other Mozart where writer/musician Sylvia Milo portrayed Nannerl in a partially fictional autobiography.
Nannerl appears in several episodes of the Amazon series Mozart in the Jungle.
Nannerl is the protagonist of the 2020 young adult historical fantasy novel The Kingdom of Back by Marie Lu.

Notes

References
Works of biography

Works of literature with Maria Anna Mozart as a main character
 Bauld has also published a fictional diary as Nannerl Mozart in the form of Nannerls' blog.
 Originally published in Italy as: 

 A historical thriller in which Nannerl travels to Vienna to uncover the mysteries of her brother's death.

External links 
 

1751 births
1829 deaths
18th-century Austrian musicians
19th-century Austrian musicians
18th-century women musicians
Maria Anna
Austrian classical pianists
Austrian harpsichordists
Austrian women pianists
Musicians from Salzburg
Austrian people of German descent
Child classical musicians
19th-century women pianists